The 1988 Virginia Slims of New Orleans was the final edition of the Virginia Slims of New Orleans tennis tournament. Chris Evert was the defending champion and won in the final 6–4, 6–1 against Anne Smith.

Seeds
A champion seed is indicated in bold text while text in italics indicates the round in which that seed was eliminated. The top four seeds received a bye to the second round.

  Chris Evert (champion)
  Barbara Potter (quarterfinals)
  Lori McNeil (quarterfinals)
  Stephanie Rehe (semifinals)
  Halle Cioffi (first round)
  Catarina Lindqvist (second round)
  Robin White (quarterfinals)
  Gretchen Magers (second round)

Draw

Final

Section 1

Section 2

References
 1988 Virginia Slims of New Orleans Draw

Virginia Slims of New Orleans
1988 WTA Tour